Loller Academy is a historic school building located at Hatboro, Montgomery County, Pennsylvania.  The original section was built in 1811, and is a two-story, stucco building measuring 65 feet wide by 56 feet long.  It has a hipped roof and 40 foot square cupola.  The building has a later two-story, 24 feet by 72 feet rear addition.  The building features a belfry with clock.  It housed a school until 1960.

It was added to the National Register of Historic Places in 1978.

It is now the Borough Hall of the Borough of Hatboro.

References

School buildings on the National Register of Historic Places in Pennsylvania
School buildings completed in 1811
Schools in Montgomery County, Pennsylvania
National Register of Historic Places in Montgomery County, Pennsylvania